Gaura neomexicana is a species of flowering plant in the evening primrose family known by the common name New Mexico beeblossom. It is native to the west central United States.

There are two subspecies of this species. One, the rare Colorado butterfly plant (ssp. coloradensis), is a federally listed threatened species of the United States. It grows along the border between Wyoming and Colorado and its distribution extends just into Nebraska. It grows in moist soils in meadows near streams in the western Great Plains. It has probably always been rare, localized, and endemic to a specific type of habitat, but it has declined due to the loss and degradation of its habitat.

References

External links

neomexicana